The winners of the 1996 Asian Cup Winners' Cup, the association football competition run by the Asian Football Confederation, are listed below.

First round

West Asia

|}
1 Al Qadisiyah withdrew

East Asia

|}
1 Old Benedictines withdrew after 1st leg 
2 2nd leg also reported 0–1 
3 Lam Pak withdrew before 1st leg

Second round

West Asia

|}

East Asia

|}
1 Valencia withdrew after 1st leg 
2 1st leg also reported as 5–1

Quarterfinals

West Asia

|}
1 Al Nasr withdrew after 1st leg

East Asia

|}

Semifinals

Third place match

Final

References
Asian Cup Winners Cup 1996
ACWC finals

Asian Cup Winners' Cup
2